Christian Kux (born 3 May 1985) is a German road bicycle racer.

Palmares

2001
  U17 Pursuit Champion
2002
  U19 Pursuit Champion
 , European U19 Team Pursuit Championship
 3rd, National U19 Team Pursuit & Time Trial Championship
2003
  U19 Pursuit Champion
 , World U19 Team Pursuit Championship
2006
 1st, UIV Cup, München
2007
 1st, Prologue, Thüringen-Rundfahrt (U23)
 2nd, National U23 Road Race Championship
 2nd, Overall, Brandenburg-Rundfahrt
 Winner Stage 5

External links 

German male cyclists
1985 births
Living people
Sportspeople from Chemnitz
Cyclists from Saxony
21st-century German people